Young Woman in White on a Red Background (French - Jeune femme en blanc, fond rouge) is a c.1946 oil on canvas painting by Henri Matisse, now in the Museum of Fine Arts of Lyon.

It belongs to a cycle of paintings of interiors begun by Matisse in 1946 whilst in his villa Le Rêve at Vence (Alpes-Maritimes), just before working on the Chapelle du Rosaire de Vence.

Sources
http://www.mba-lyon.fr/mba/sections/fr/collections-musee/peintures/oeuvres-peintures/xxe_siecle/matisse_jeune_femme

1946 paintings
Paintings by Henri Matisse
Paintings in the collection of the Museum of Fine Arts of Lyon
Oil on canvas paintings